Korivi Muralidhar, popularly known as Khushi Murali (1963 – 11 January 2013), was an Indian playback singer. He became popular as a result of his hit song "Aadavari Matalaku" from the movie, Kushi.

Life
He was born in Renigunta in Chittoor district. He moved to Chennai for opportunities in the film industry.

He sang over 500 film songs and 1,000 devotional songs for private albums in his career over two decades. His daughter Haripriya is also a playback singer.

Death
He died on 11 January 2013 of a heart attack. He was on his way to perform at Kakinada Beach Festival.

References

Telugu playback singers
Tamil playback singers
1963 births
2013 deaths
Indian male playback singers
People from Chittoor district
20th-century Indian singers
Singers from Andhra Pradesh
Film musicians from Andhra Pradesh
20th-century Indian male singers